Syllepte fuscomarginalis is a moth in the family Crambidae. It was described by John Henry Leech in 1889. It is found in Japan (Honshu) and western China.

References

Moths described in 1889
fuscomarginalis
Moths of Japan
Moths of Asia